Karl Gamma (19 September 1927 – 5 January 2021) was a Swiss alpine skier. He competed in the men's slalom at the 1948 Winter Olympics. He authored a ski handbook published in seven languages.

References

External links
 

1927 births
2021 deaths
Swiss male alpine skiers
Olympic alpine skiers of Switzerland
Alpine skiers at the 1948 Winter Olympics
People from the canton of Uri